Miloš Hrstić (born 20 November 1955 in Vojnić) is a Yugoslav retired football player.

During his club career he played for HNK Rijeka, Deportivo de La Coruña and Olimpija Ljubljana. He earned ten caps for the Yugoslavia national football team, and participated in the 1982 FIFA World Cup.

Playing career

Club
Miloš Hrstić started his senior career in Rijeka, where he passed all the young selections and was a member of all Yugoslavia youth team selections, from U15 to U21. First coach that put him in the team was Dragutin Spasojević, who was head of staff when Rijeka won their two National cups in 1978 and 1979. From 1978 to 1984 Rijeka was the best Croatian club in the Yugoslav First League. In 1979, he had the debut for Yugoslavia, in friendly match against Argentina (4-1 win).

In the European competitions from 1978 to 1984 Rijeka was undefeated on her own stadium Kantrida Wrexham A.F.C. 3–0, K.S.K. Beveren 0–0, K.F.C. Germinal Beerschot 2–1, FC Lokomotíva Košice 3–0, Juventus F.C. 0–0, Real Valladolid 4–1, Real Madrid C.F. 3-1. The only two team who managed to get a draw where Juventus and Beveren. In 1984, with coach Josip Skoblar, Olympique de Marseille best player of all times, they lost the Championship title in the last match against Red Star Belgrade, later winner of the UEFA Champions League.

International
Hrstić made his debut in a November 1978 Balkan Cup match against Greece and earned a total of 10 caps, scoring no goals. He also played in the 1979 game against Argentina in Belgrade which was Dragan Džajić's official retirement match. After that he played in the qualifiers for the 1982 FIFA World Cup in Spain and on the same World Cup where he played the first match against Northern Ireland, which proved to be his final international appearance.

Coaching career
He started in the youth teams of Rijeka, coaching after that Croatian clubs Orijent, Pazinka, Grobničan. In 1994, he went in Oman as coach of their best and most trophied club, Dhofar. With them he won the silver medal in the Gulf Club Champions Cup and then was called by Bahrein club East Riffa Club
where he stayed two years. In 1998, he was signed by then called Sichuan Quanxing FC, Sichuan Guancheng, biggest club in Sichuan province and achieved best results in club history, 3rd place in Chinese Super League. He was the first Croatian coach ever in China, where he is called Miluo Xi or 007 (famous movie character James Bond). He changed many clubs in China, in FC Hunan Shoking, he settled the bases of their team, introduced youngsters and nowadays they have the carriers of the clubs successes in Chinese Super League. His name and successes in China contributed that after five years away he again signed with Hunan Xiangtao FC, a new club founded in 2007. Every year they made a step ahead, winning the championship of China League Three and China League Two. They want now to make another step and win promotion to the Chinese Super League, and they hired Mr. Milos as head coach who can put the foundations of the squad, introduce young players and at the same time make a good result.

Career statistics

Awards and achievements

Player

NK Rijeka
 Yugoslav Cup: 1978, 1979
 Balkans Cup: 1978

Individual
 Player with most trophies and awards in NK Rijeka's history
 Most capped NK Rijeka player ever in Yugoslavia National team
 NK Rijeka player of the year: 1978, 1979, 1980, 1981, 1982

Yugoslavia
 UEFA European Under-21 Football Championship: 1978
Mediterranean Games: Split 1979
Olympic Games Fourth place: Moscow 1980

Manager

NK Pazinka
Druga HNL - West: 1992

NK Grobničan
4. HNL - West: 2007-08

Education
 Certificate Head Football Coach - Department for coach education, Institute of Kinesiology of the University of Zagreb
 Certificate UEFA PRO Licensed Coach - Croatian Football Federation

References

External links
 
 
 

1955 births
Living people
Footballers from Rijeka
Serbs of Croatia
Association football defenders
Yugoslav footballers

HNK Rijeka players
Deportivo de La Coruña players
NK Olimpija Ljubljana (1945–2005) players

Yugoslavia under-21 international footballers
Yugoslavia international footballers
1982 FIFA World Cup players
Competitors at the 1979 Mediterranean Games
Mediterranean Games gold medalists for Yugoslavia
Mediterranean Games medalists in football
Olympic footballers of Yugoslavia
Footballers at the 1980 Summer Olympics

Yugoslav First League players
Segunda División players
Yugoslav expatriate footballers
Expatriate footballers in Spain
Yugoslav expatriate sportspeople in Spain

Croatian football managers
HNK Orijent managers
HNK Rijeka non-playing staff
Dhofar Club managers
East Riffa Club managers
Al-Ittihad Kalba SC managers
Henan Songshan Longmen F.C. managers
Chongqing Liangjiang Athletic F.C. managers
Busaiteen Club managers
Hunan Billows F.C. managers
Al-Taawoun FC managers

Croatian expatriate football managers
Expatriate football managers in Oman
Croatian expatriate sportspeople in Oman
Expatriate football managers in Bahrain
Croatian expatriate sportspeople in Bahrain
Expatriate football managers in the United Arab Emirates
Croatian expatriate sportspeople in the United Arab Emirates
Expatriate football managers in China
Croatian expatriate sportspeople in China
Expatriate football managers in Saudi Arabia
Croatian expatriate sportspeople in Saudi Arabia